Silence is the debut album by Canadian singer-songwriter Tara MacLean, released in 1996 (see 1996 in music).

Track listing 
"Evidence" – 4:56Tara MacLean, Greg Reely, Stephen Nikleva
"Let Her Feel The Rain" – 5:27MacLean
"That's Me" – 4:34MacLean
"More" – 4:58MacLean
"Silence" – 5:49MacLean, Nikleva
"Red" – 4:22Jon Levine, MacLean
"Holy Tears" – 4:05MacLean
"In The Wings" – 3:54MacLean
"If You Could" – 3:19MacLean
"For You" – 3:55MacLean
"Let Her Feel The Rain" [Acoustic] – 5:03MacLean
"Holy Tears" [Instrumental] – 4:07MacLean

Personnel
Tara MacLean – vocals (1, 2, 3, 4, 5, 6, 7, 8, 9, 10, 11, 12), backing vocals (1, 2, 3, 4, 7, 10, 11, 12), acoustic guitar (3, 4), voices (6), classical guitar (9)
Ashwin Sood – Djembe (1, 4), drums (2, 6, 9, 10, 11), percussion (2, 11), shaker (8)
Chris Von Sneidern – acoustic guitar (2, 4, 11), electric guitar (4)
Mark Jowett – 12-string guitar (7, 12), acoustic guitar (10), electric guitar (10)
Veda Hille – piano (4, 6, 8, 10)
Bruce Kaphan – pedal steel (2, 11)
Daniel Presley – keyboard (1), backing vocals (4)
Dave Kershaw – Hammond organ (7, 8, 12), keyboard (9)
David Revelli – percussion (4, 7, 8, 12)
Jack Hines – upright bass (6), string bass (10)
Mark V – sequencing (9, 11, 12), drum program (10)
Michael Been – acoustic guitar (1), electric guitar (1)
Norman Kerner – acoustic guitar (2, 11)
Peggy Lee – cello (7, 8, 10, 12), string arrangement (7, 8, 12)
Robin Winburn – saxophone (4, 6)
Stephen Nikleva – acoustic guitar (7, 9, 12), electric guitar (5, 7, 12), bass guitar (9)
Tim Haggerty – string samples (3)
Tony Marryatt – bass guitar (1, 2, 3, 4, 11)

Production
 Produced by Norman Kerner (1, 2, 3, 4, 5, 6, 10, 12)
 Associate Producer: Daniel Presley (1, 2, 3, 4, 5, 6, 10, 12)
 Assistant Engineer: Mike Bogus (1, 2, 3, 4, 5, 6, 10, 12)
 Produced by Norman Kerner, Tara MacLean (7, 8, 11)
 Produced by Greg Reely, Stephen Nikleva (5)
 Produced by Greg Reely, Stephen Nikleva, Kevin Hamilton (9)
 Recorded and Mixed at Brilliant Studios (1, 2, 3, 4, 6, 11, 12)
 Recorded and Mixed by Norman Kerner, Daniel Presley (1, 2, 3, 4, 6, 11, 12)
 Additional Recording at Slack Studios (7, 8, 9, 10)
 Additional Recording at The Glass Elevator (7, 8, 9, 10)
 Additional Recording by Kevin Hamilton (7, 8, 9, 10)
 Recorded and Mixed by Greg Reely (5)
 

Tara MacLean albums
1996 debut albums
Nettwerk Records albums
Albums produced by Greg Reely